Gaylord is an unincorporated community in northern Clarke County, Virginia. Gaylord is located on Lord Fairfax Highway (U.S. Route 340). The community had its own post office in operation from 1880 to 1956.

Unincorporated communities in Clarke County, Virginia
Unincorporated communities in Virginia